was a  after Jōgen and before Kempo. This period spanned the years from March 1211 through December 1213.

Change of era
 1211 : The new era name was created because the previous era ended and a new one commenced in Jōgen 2, on the 9th day of the 3rd month of 1211.

Events of the Kenryaku era
 1211 (Kenryaku 1, 1st month): Shōgun Sanetomo's position at court was raised to the 1st rank of the 3rd class.

 1211 (Kenryaku 1, 1st month): The Buddhist priest Hōnen returned to Kyoto from a period of exile. He was the founder and guiding force behind the early development of the  temple-complex.
 January 12, 1212 (Kenryaku 2, 20th day of the 12th month): The Buddhist priest Hōnen died at age 80, mere days after drafting a brief, written summary of his life teachings. This last written document is known as the One-Sheet Document (ichimai-kishomon).
 1212 (Kenryaku 2, 16th day of the 1st month): The former-Senior High Priest Jien (1155–1225) was appointed Tendai Abbot by Imperial Mandate. He would administer Mt. Hiei for one year before yielding the position on the 11th day of the 1st month of 1213.

Notes

References
 Brown, Delmer and Ichiro Ishida. (1979). The Future and the Past: a translation and study of the 'Gukanshō', an interpretative history of Japan written in 1219.  Berkeley: University of California Press. ;  OCLC 5145872
 Kitagawa, Hiroshi and Bruce T. Tsuchida, eds. (1975). The Tale of the Heike. Tokyo: University of Tokyo Press. 	; ; ; ;  OCLC 193064639
 Nussbaum, Louis-Frédéric and Käthe Roth. (2005).  Japan encyclopedia. Cambridge: Harvard University Press. ;  OCLC 58053128
 Titsingh, Isaac. (1834). Nihon Odai Ichiran; ou,  Annales des empereurs du Japon.  Paris: Royal Asiatic Society, Oriental Translation Fund of Great Britain and Ireland. OCLC 5850691
 Varley, H. Paul. (1980). A Chronicle of Gods and Sovereigns: Jinnō Shōtōki of Kitabatake Chikafusa. New York: Columbia University Press. ;  OCLC 6042764

External links
 National Diet Library, "The Japanese Calendar" -- historical overview plus illustrative images from library's collection

Japanese eras
1210s in Japan